Takali Haji is a village in the Shirur taluka of the Pune District, Maharashtra, India.

Takali Haji is situated on the bank of the River Ghodnadi.

References 

Villages in Pune district